Verneřice is a town in Děčín District in the Ústí nad Labem Region of the Czech Republic. It has about 1,200 inhabitants.

Administrative parts
Villages of Čáslav, Loučky, Příbram, Rychnov and Rytířov are administrative parts of Verneřice.

Notable people
Josef Strobach (1852–1905), politician, Mayor of Vienna

References

Populated places in Děčín District
Cities and towns in the Czech Republic